Koekelberg is one of the 19 municipalities of the Brussels-Capital Region, Belgium. Located in the north-western part of the region, it is bordered by Berchem-Sainte-Agathe, Ganshoren, Jette, and Molenbeek-Saint-Jean. In common with all of Brussels' municipalities, it is legally bilingual (French–Dutch).

, the municipality had a population of 22,023 inhabitants.

The municipality—the smallest in the Brussels region by population—is dominated by the National Basilica of the Sacred Heart (or Koekelberg Basilica), one of the largest Roman Catholic churches in the world.

The main transportation hub of the municipality are the connected Simonis and Elisabeth metro stations, served by the Brussels Intercommunal Transport Company (STIB/MIVB) system.

References

Notes

Bibliography

External links
 
 Official site (in French and Dutch)

 
Municipalities of the Brussels-Capital Region
Populated places in Belgium